Ballyragget is a small town on the river Nore in the north of County Kilkenny in Ireland. As of the 2016 census, it had a population of 1,082 people.

Toponymy 
The name 'Ragget' is Anglo-Norman in origin, and denotes a once-prominent Norman landowner Richard le Ragget who held these lands in the early part of the 13th century.

Older names of the settlement include Donoughmore (or Donaghmore;  "large church") and the even more ancient Tullabarry - the name of a Celtic or possibly pre-Celtic tribe which held their seat in the vicinity.  There is some debate as to the meaning of Donoughmore. The very first issue of the Journal of the Kilkenny Archaeological Society (January 1948), which has an article about Ballyragget and its environs, states a belief that Domhnach Mór means "big Sunday" and relates to the fact that thousands of people congregated at the now ruined church in Donoughmore for its opening on a Sunday and the name stuck.

History
The settlement of Ballyragget originally formed at a fording-point on the River Nore at this location. Originally named after the 13th century Anglo-Norman landowner Richard le Ragget, Ballyragget was later held by Mountgarret family. The town is dominated by a large medieval keep (known as Ballyragget Castle) and its adjoining walls. This tower dates to the late 15th century, and contains a late 16th century inscribed stone which commemorates Edmund Butler, 2nd Viscount Mountgarret.

Much of the town streetscape was laid out around the town's square in the mid-17th century. A large mid 19th-century Catholic church sits on a rise overlooking the town's central square.

Geography 
The River Nore flows beside the town, which nestles in a wide alluvial valley between the Attanagh Plateau and several hills to the east, including 'Knockmannon' and 'The Balla boys'. The statistical Ballyragget Geographical Area is recorded by the CSO as containing .

To the north lies the town of Durrow in County Laois, to the south the River Nore flows on towards Kilkenny City.

The town is located in the townland of the same name which is in the civil parish of Donoghmore in the ancient barony of Fassadinin.

Demographics
Central Statistics Office reports indicate that Ballyragget's population increased by over 30% in the 20 years between the 1996 census and the 2016 census of Ireland, from 803 to 1,082 inhabitants.

The electoral division which surrounds the town had a population of 1,451 in the 2006 census.

The majority of residents in Ballyragget are nominally Roman Catholic, although there are minority Protestant and non-religious populations.

Economy
Agriculture and the agri-food industry are the largest employers, with the large Tirlán factory across the river dominating the town's industry for the past forty years. The plant at Ballyragget is the largest multi-purpose integrated dairy plant in Europe, and both Glanbia plc and Tirlán can trace their roots to the Avonmore co-operative founded in Ballyragget in the 1960s.

A percentage of the area's residents commute to work (or education) some distance from the town.

Politics 

At national level, Ballyragget, as part of the Carlow–Kilkenny constituency, is represented by five Teachtaí Dála in Dáil Éireann.

At a local level, the town is within the administrative area of Kilkenny County Council.

Ballyragget is also a local electoral area of County Kilkenny and includes the electoral divisions of Attanagh, Balleen, Ballyconra, Ballyragget, Baunmore, Castlecomer, Clogh, Clogharinka, Clomantagh, Coolcraheen, Freshford, Galmoy, Glashare, Johnstown, Kilkieran, Kilmacar, Lisdowney, Moneenroe, Mothell, Muckalee, Odagh, Rathbeagh, Rathcoole, Tiscoffin, Tubbridbrittain and Urlingford.

People 
 Mabel Cahill, a champion tennis player who won the U.S. Open and held the singles, doubles and mixed titles for 1891–1892, was born in Ballyragget

See also
 List of towns and villages in Ireland

References

Further reading 

 

Towns and villages in County Kilkenny
Census towns in County Kilkenny
Townlands of County Kilkenny